Francesco Lauri (1610–1635) was an Italian painter of the Baroque period, active mainly in Rome, but also throughout other parts of eastern and northern Italy and some of France, Spain and Greece.

Biography
He was the oldest son of the Flemish painter Balthasar Lauwers (Baltassare Lauri).  His father was a landscape painter and pupil of Paul Bril who had emigrated from Antwerp to Milan and then settled in Rome. Francesco's younger brother Fillipo Lauri was also a painter and a pupil of Angelo Caroselli. Francesco was a disciple of his father and of Andrea Sacchi. He is said by Baldinucci to have painted one of the ovals in the ceiling of the Palazzo de' Crescenzi, and often painted figures for Claude Lorraine.

Sources
See Artists in biographies by Filippo Baldinucci
Googlebooks entry

1610 births
1635 deaths
17th-century Italian painters
Italian male painters
Italian Baroque painters
Painters from Rome